Temperance Island is an island off of Waugoshance Point, in Lake Michigan. It is located in Bliss Township of Emmet County, Michigan. Temperance and nearby Waugoshance Island are part of the Wilderness State Park. The Big Cut Canal separates the islands from Waugoshance Point. Together the islands form the northern boundary for sturgeon bay.

Surrounding the island are shallow water shoals, that prove to be challenging for navigation. The White Shoal Light and the Grays Reef Light are also in the waters near the island.

Climate

References

Islands of Lake Michigan in Michigan